Volker Oppitz (born 16 February 1978 in Dresden) is a former German footballer who played as a defender for Dynamo Dresden, where he also worked as managing director.

Career
He broke into the Dynamo first-team in 2001 after the club had been relegated to the Oberliga, and has been a first-team regular ever since, through two promotions and one relegation. Oppitz suffered with injury towards the end of his career, and was forced to retire in June 2010, at which point Dynamo appointed him as managing director on an interim basis.

Personal life
His father Volker, is honorary chairman of Dynamo Dresden.

References

External links
  

1978 births
Living people
Footballers from Dresden
German footballers
Association football defenders
Dynamo Dresden players
Dynamo Dresden II players
Dynamo Dresden non-playing staff
2. Bundesliga players
3. Liga players